Isohypsibius is a genus of water bear or moss piglet, a tardigrade in the class Eutardigrada.

Species

 Isohypsibius altai Kaczmarek and Michalczyk, 2006
 Isohypsibius annulatus (Murray, 1905)
 Isohypsibius arbiter Binda, 1980
 Isohypsibius archangajensis Kaczmarek and Michalczyk, 2004
 Isohypsibius arcuatus (Bartos, 1934)
 Isohypsibius asper (Murray, 1906)
 Isohypsibius austriacus (Iharos, 1966)
 Isohypsibius baicalensis (Ramazzotti, 1966)
 Isohypsibius baldii (Ramazzotti, 1945)
 Isohypsibius baldiioides Tumanov, 2003
 Isohypsibius barbarae Pilato & Binda 2002
 Isohypsibius bartosi (Iharos, 1966)
 Isohypsibius basalovoi (Durante and Maucci, 1972)
 Isohypsibius belliformis (Mihelcic, 1971)
 Isohypsibius bellus (Mihelcic, 1971)
 Isohypsibius borkini Tumanov, 2003
 Isohypsibius brevispinosus (Iharos, 1966)
 Isohypsibius brulloi Pilato and Pennini, 1976
 Isohypsibius bulbifer (Mihelcic, 1957)
 Isohypsibius cameruni (Iharos, 1969)
 Isohypsibius campbellensis Pilato, 1996
 Isohypsibius canadensis (Murray, 1910)
 Isohypsibius ceciliae Pilato and Binda, 1987
 Isohypsibius changbaiensis Yang, 1999
 Isohypsibius chiarae Maucci 1987
 Isohypsibius costatus (Mihelcic, 1971)
 Isohypsibius cyrilli (Mihelcic, 1942)
 Isohypsibius dastychi Pilato, Bertolani and Binda, 1982
 Isohypsibius deconincki Pilato 1971
 Isohypsibius deflexus (Mihelcic, 1960)
 Isohypsibius dudichi (Iharos, 1964)
 Isohypsibius duranteae (Maucci, 1978)
 Isohypsibius effusus (Mihelcic, 1971)
 Isohypsibius elegans (Binda and Pilato, 1971)
 Isohypsibius eplenyiensis (Iharos, 1970)
 Isohypsibius franzi (Mihelcic, 1949)
 Isohypsibius fuscus (Mihelcic, 1971)
 Isohypsibius gibbus (Marcus, 1928)
 Isohypsibius gilvus Biserov, 1986
 Isohypsibius glaber (Durante Pasa and Maucci, 1979)
 Isohypsibius glazovi Biserov, 1999
 Isohypsibius gracilis (Iharos, 1966)
 Isohypsibius granditintinus Chang and Rho, 1996
 Isohypsibius granulifer Thulin 1928
 Isohypsibius gyulai (Mihelcic, 1971)
 Isohypsibius hadzii (Mihelcic, 1938)
 Isohypsibius helenae (Iharos, 1964)
 Isohypsibius hydrogogianus Ito and Tagami, 1993
 Isohypsibius hypostomoides (Mihelcic, 1971)
 Isohypsibius improvisus Dastych, 1984
 Isohypsibius indicus (Murray, 1907)
 Isohypsibius irregibilis Biserov, 1992
 Isohypsibius itoi (Tsurusaki, 1980)
 Isohypsibius jakieli Dastych, 1984
 Isohypsibius jingshanensis Yang, 2003
 Isohypsibius josephi (Iharos, 1964)
 Isohypsibius kenodontis Kendall-Fite and Nelson, 1996
 Isohypsibius kotovae Tumanov, 2003
 Isohypsibius kristenseni Pilato, Catanzaro and Binda, 1989
 Isohypsibius ladogensis Tumanov, 2003
 Isohypsibius laevis McInnes, 1995
 Isohypsibius landalti (Iharos, 1966)
 Isohypsibius latiunguis (Iharos, 1964)
 Isohypsibius leithaicus (Iharos, 1966)
 Isohypsibius liae Li and Wang, 2006
 Isohypsibius lineatus (Mihelcic, 1969)
 Isohypsibius longiunguis Pilato 1974
 Isohypsibius lunulatus (Iharos, 1966)
 Isohypsibius macrodactylus (Maucci, 1978)
 Isohypsibius malawiensis Jørgensen, 2002
 Isohypsibius mammillosus (Iharos, 1964)
 Isohypsibius marcellinoi (Binda and Pilato, 1971)
 Isohypsibius marii Bertolani, 1982
 Isohypsibius mihelcici (Iharos, 1964)
 Isohypsibius monoicus Bertolani, 1982
 Isohypsibius monstruosus Maucci, 1991
 Isohypsibius montanus (Mihelcic, 1938)
 Isohypsibius myrops (Du Bois-Reymond Marcus, 1944)
 Isohypsibius neoundulatus (Durante Pasa and Maucci, 1975)
 Isohypsibius nipponicus Sudzuki, 1975
 Isohypsibius nodosus (Murray, 1907)
 Isohypsibius novaeguineae (Iharos, 1967)
 Isohypsibius palmai Pilato, 1996
 Isohypsibius panovi Tumanov, 2005
 Isohypsibius papillifer (Murray, 1905)
 Isohypsibius pappi (Iharos, 1966)
 Isohypsibius pauper (Mihelcic, 1971)
 Isohypsibius pilatoi (Durante Pasa and Maucci, 1979)
 Isohypsibius pratensis (Iharos, 1964)
 Isohypsibius prosostomus Thulin, 1928
 Isohypsibius pseudoundulatus (da Cunha and do Nascimento Ribeiro, 1946)
 Isohypsibius pulcher (Mihelcic, 1971)
 Isohypsibius pushkini Tumanov, 2003
 Isohypsibius qinlingensis Li, Wang and Yu, 2005
 Isohypsibius rahmi Li and Wang, 2006
 Isohypsibius reticulatus Pilato, 1973
 Isohypsibius roberti Biserov, 1996
 Isohypsibius ronsisvallei Binda and Pilato, 1969
 Isohypsibius rudescui (Iharos, 1966)
 Isohypsibius rugosus Guidi and Grabowski, 1996
 Isohypsibius sabellai Pilato, Binda, Napolitano and Moncada, 2004
 Isohypsibius saltursus Schuster, Toftner and Grigarick, 1978
 Isohypsibius sattleri (Richters 1902)
 Isohypsibius schaudinni (Richters, 1909)
 Isohypsibius sculptus (Ramazzotti 1962)
 Isohypsibius sellnicki (Mihelcic, 1962)
 Isohypsibius septentrionalis Thulin, 1928
 Isohypsibius silvicola (Iharos, 1966)
 Isohypsibius sismicus (Maucci, 1978)
 Isohypsibius solidus (Mihelcic, 1971)
 Isohypsibius taibaiensis Li and Wang, 2005
 Isohypsibius tetradactyloides (Richters, 1907)
 Isohypsibius theresiae (Iharos, 1964)
 Isohypsibius torulosus (Mihelcic, 1959)
 Isohypsibius truncorum (Iharos, 1964)
 Isohypsibius tuberculatus (Plate, 1889)
 Isohypsibius tuberculoides (Mihelcic, 1949)
 Isohypsibius tubereticulatus Pilato and Catanzaro, 1990
 Isohypsibius tucumanensis Claps and Rossi, 1984
 Isohypsibius undulatus Thulin 1928
 Isohypsibius vejdovskyi (Bartos, 1939)
 Isohypsibius verae Pilato and Catanzaro, 1990
 Isohypsibius vietnamensis (Iharos, 1969)
 Isohypsibius wilsoni (Horning, Schuster and Grigarick, 1978)
 Isohypsibius woodsae Kathman, 1990
 Isohypsibius zierhofferi Dastych, 1979

References

External links

Parachaela
Tardigrade genera
Polyextremophiles